Ex parte Jackson, 96 U.S. 727 (1878), was a United States Supreme Court ex parte decision. The case decided that the United States Post Office may open and inspect mail to limit the transmission of circulars on lotteries. It also extended Fourth Amendment protections to private letters, holding that letters and sealed packages sent through the mail required warrants to be searched through.

Notes

External links
 

United States Supreme Court cases
United States Supreme Court cases of the Waite Court
1878 in United States case law